Cytaea rai is a species of jumping spider.

Name
Rai are the large stone discs used as money in Yap.

Distribution
Cytaea rai is only known from Yap in the Caroline Islands.

References
  (2007): The world spider catalog, version 8.0. American Museum of Natural History.

External links
  (1998): Salticidae of the Pacific Islands. III.  Distribution of Seven Genera, with Description of Nineteen New Species and Two New Genera. Journal of Arachnology 26(2): 149-189. PDF

Fauna of the Federated States of Micronesia
Spiders of Oceania
rai
Spiders described in 1998